A fifth referendum on the Compact of Free Association was held in Palau on 30 June 1987, after the previous four referendums had failed to achieve the 75% in favour necessary. Voters were asked whether they approved of the Compact of Free Association between Palau and the United States signed on 10 January 1986. It was approved by 67.6% of voters, with a turnout of 76.1%. Following the fifth failure to achieve the necessary majority, a constitutional referendum was held in August, with the aim of reducing the majority needed.

Results

References

1987 referendums
1987 in Palau
Referendums in Palau